Nooj may refer to:
 NooJ, a computer program for natural language processing
 Nooj, one of the Characters of Final Fantasy X and X-2